is a town located in Aki District, Hiroshima Prefecture, Japan. As of May 2017, the town has an estimated population of 13,265 and a density of 850 persons per km². The total area is 15.64 km².

References

External links

Saka official website 

Towns in Hiroshima Prefecture